Heinrich Wangnereck (July 1595 – 11 November 1664) was a Catholic theologian, preacher, author. He was born in Munich.

The extant sketches of his life give no uniform information respecting the dates of events; it is, however, unanimously stated that when sixteen years old he entered the novitiate of the upper German province of the Society of Jesus, at Landsberg, took the usual course of instruction, and in addition was for a time teacher of the lowest class at the gymnasium.

His chief occupation was that of a professor of philosophy and theology at the University of Dillingen, where he was chancellor, according to one statement, for twenty-four years. In addition to teaching, he was also a noted preacher. In 1655 he was sent to Lindau as superior and missioner, but after five years returned to Dillingen where he was chancellor until his death, which followed a sudden stroke of apoplexy at table.

It is said that his reputation for learning and ability was so widespread that many secular and spiritual princes, bishops, and prelates of Germany asked his advice in the most important matters. His works, of which twenty are known, are chiefly on theological subjects. He also took part in the political controversies of the period, but not always to the satisfaction of authority, as there is record of a punishment inflicted upon him by the general of the Society because he had spoken disrespectfully of the Duke of Bavaria.

His first small work, "Notae in confessiones S. Augustini", published in 1630, has retained its popularity up to the present time; in 1907 a fourth edition of it appeared.

Wangereck died at Dillingen.

17th-century German Catholic theologians
1595 births
1664 deaths
17th-century German Jesuits
German male non-fiction writers
17th-century German writers
17th-century German male writers